Routouang Yoma Golom (died 22 January 2021) was a Chadian militant and politician. He served as Minister of the Interior and Minister of Public Security. He also served as a Deputy in the National Assembly of Chad, and was a member of the Patriotic Salvation Movement.

Decorations
Officer of the Order of Mono

References

Patriotic Salvation Movement politicians
2021 deaths
Year of birth missing
People from N'Djamena